Gymnopilus squamulosus is a species of mushroom in the family Hymenogastraceae.

See also

List of Gymnopilus species

External links
Gymnopilus squamulosus at Index Fungorum

squamulosus
Taxa named by William Alphonso Murrill